Qezel Dash-e Olya (also Romanized as Qezel Dāsh-e ‘Olyā; also known as Qezeldāsh-e Bālā) is a village in Sokmanabad Rural District, Safayyeh District, Khoy County, West Azerbaijan Province, Iran. At the 2006 census, its population was 326, in 64 families.

References 

Populated places in Khoy County